Young Money Entertainment is an American record label founded by rapper Lil Wayne. Young Money's president is Lil Wayne's lifelong friend and fellow rapper Mack Maine. The label was an imprint of Cash Money Records and is distributed by Republic Records.

The label has released fifteen US albums that reached number one on the Billboard 200 chart: Tha Carter III, I Am Not a Human Being, Tha Carter IV, Tha Carter V, and Funeral by Lil Wayne, Thank Me Later, Take Care, Nothing Was the Same, If You're Reading This It's Too Late, What a Time to Be Alive (along with Epic Records artist Future), Views, More Life, and Scorpion by Drake, and Pink Friday and Pink Friday: Roman Reloaded by Nicki Minaj.

Current artists include Lil Wayne, Nicki Minaj, Mack Maine, Lil Twist, and Cory Gunz, among others. The label has released three compilation albums — We Are Young Money (2009), Rich Gang (2013; with Cash Money Records), and Young Money: Rise of an Empire (2014).

History

The label was formed in 2005. In 2007, In an interview with Vibe magazine, Lil Wayne detailed he stepped down as President of the label, and had given the position to Cortez Bryant. As of 2009, Mack Maine is serving as president. Canadian rapper Drake signed a joint venture between Cash Money Records and Young Money. President Mack Maine confirmed that Omarion was no longer on the label after many rumours were circulating the internet.

To promote the label's first collaboration album, We Are Young Money, Young Money artists embarked on the Young Money Tour. The collaborative album was released on December 21, 2009, and debuted at number nine on the US Billboard 200 chart, selling 142,000 copies in its first-week sales. The album was certified gold by the Recording Industry Association of America (RIAA) for selling over a shipments of 500,000 copies in the United States.

We Are Young Money featured the highly successful single "BedRock", which debuted at thirty six on the Billboard Hot 100 on the week ending December 12, 2009. On the week ending March 13, 2010, the song reached a peak of two, making it the most successful single by the group on the chart.
"BedRock" debuted in the UK Singles Chart on February 6, 2010, at forty. On March 6, 2010, the single climbed to twenty two, and the subsequent week the single climbed to eighteen, marking Young Money's first Top 20 hit in the UK. Peaking at number nine on April 3, 2010, making it Young Money's first Top 10 hit in the UK.

The label had three of the top 10 highest 2010 hip hop album sales with Drake's Thank Me Later, and Lil Wayne's Rebirth and I Am Not a Human Being.

On March 6, 2010, Lil Wayne confirmed that rapper Cory Gunz was the latest artist to sign. In 2011, Konvict Muzik artist T-Pain signed to the Young Money roster after he and Akon agreed to part ways after his last Konvict release RevolveR. Later that year, T-Pain revealed that he was close to signing a deal with Young Money, but it never concluded. In November 2011, Lil Wayne introduced 14-year-old singer Torion Sellers to Young Money.

On February 15, 2013, Mack Maine announced group We the Future and Lil Wayne's 14-year-old daughter Reginae Carter had signed to Young Money. In the same year, Young Money released Lil Wayne's I Am Not a Human Being II, Tyga's Hotel California and Drake's Nothing Was the Same on March 26, April 7, and September 24, respectively.

In December 2012 Mack Maine announced a second Young Money album would be released. In February 2013, label co-owner Birdman released a compilation mixtape with Cash Money and Young Money titled Rich Gang: All Stars. Shortly after, Birdman announced compilation album Rich Gang and its schedule for release to be on May 21, 2013. He added Rich Gang would feature members of Cash Money, Young Money and various Young Money collaborators. The first single from the project, "Tapout", was released on March 12, 2013, and featured Lil Wayne, Future, Mack Maine, and Nicki Minaj and produced by 808 Mafia's Southside and TM88. The album would then be pushed back to July 23, 2013.

On January 22, 2014, it was revealed that Young Money would be releasing their own compilation album on March 11, 2014, titled Young Money: Rise of an Empire. That same day, the first single "We Alright" featuring Lil Wayne, Birdman and Euro was released. Drake's Nothing Was the Same leftover "Trophies" would also be included on the album.

The album's second single, "Senile", was released February 14, 2014. It is by Tyga, Nicki Minaj and Lil Wayne and was produced by David D.A. Doman. "Trophies" and Minaj's "Lookin Ass" were met with more chart success than the first two singles.

After years of tensions with Birdman and Universal Music Group over unpaid advances and rights to his catalogue, Lil Wayne filed for lawsuit in 2015 initially for $51 million. In 2018, Lil Wayne and Universal settled, which detailed Lil Wayne would be compensated over $10 million from previously failed payments, and Young Money's ownership would be transferred from Cash Money to Universal directly. Additionally, Birdman's 49 percent ownership in Young Money would be transferred to Wayne, which took effect on September 13, 2018.

In June 2020, Lil Wayne, through the Young Money name, sold his master recordings in a settlement from Republic Records to its overhead company, Universal Music Group for $100 million. It was confirmed later in December when, arising out of recent court filings from Lil Wayne's lawsuit with his former manager Ronald Sweeney, that the settlement not only included his masters, but also the entire Young Money Entertainment catalog, including Nicki Minaj, Drake, Tyga, among other artists in their roster. As of December 2020, UMG reportedly owns all of Drake's pre-2018 album catalogue that has been released with the Young Money record label.

Notable artists

Current acts

Baby E
 Christina Milian
 Cory Gunz
 Euro
 Flow
 Gudda Gudda
Hoodybaby
 Jay Jones
 Lil Twist
 Lil Wayne
 Mack Maine
LIL Mafioso
 Nicki Minaj
Reginae Carter
 Shanell
T-Streets
Vice Versa

Former acts

 Austin Mahone
 Boo
 Chanel West Coast
 Currensy
 DJ Khaled
 Drake
 Glasses Malone
 Jae Millz
 Jay Sean
 Kevin Rudolf
 Kidd Kidd
 Lloyd
 Omarion
 PJ Morton
 Tyga

In-house producers
 Detail
 The Olympicks

Discography

Compilation albums

Mixtapes

Singles

Other charted songs

Full discography

References

External links
 

Record labels established in 2005
American record labels
Contemporary R&B record labels
American hip hop record labels
Pop record labels
Vanity record labels
Labels distributed by Universal Music Group
Record labels based in Louisiana
Lil Wayne